Malcolm Clark (born 24 July 1929) is a South African cricketer. He played in six first-class matches for Eastern Province from 1950/51 to 1956/57.

See also
 List of Eastern Province representative cricketers

References

External links
 

1929 births
Possibly living people
South African cricketers
Eastern Province cricketers
Cricketers from Port Elizabeth